Kana Extended-A is a Unicode block containing hentaigana (non-standard hiragana) and historic kana characters. Additional hentaigana characters are encoded in the Kana Supplement block.

Block

History
The following Unicode-related documents record the purpose and process of defining specific characters in the Kana Extended-A block:

See also 
 Kana Supplement (Unicode block)
 Small Kana Extension (Unicode block)
 Hiragana (Unicode block)
 Katakana (Unicode block)
 Kana Extended-B (Unicode block)

References 

Unicode blocks